Nelson Andrés Soto Martínez (born 19 June 1994 in Barranquilla) is a Colombian cyclist, who currently rides for UCI Continental team . In August 2018, he was named in the startlist for the Vuelta a España.

Major results
2017
 1st  Road race, Pan American Road Championships
 Vuelta a Colombia
1st  Points classification
1st Stages 3, 10 & 11
2018 
 1st  Road race, Central American and Caribbean Games
 1st Stage 2 Vuelta a la Comunidad de Madrid
2019
 4th Route Adélie
 10th Trofeo Matteotti
2020
 4th Poreč Trophy
2021 
 1st  Road race, Pan American Road Championships
 1st Stage 1 Vuelta a Colombia
2022
 4th Road race, National Road Championships

Grand Tour general classification results timeline

References

External links

1994 births
Living people
Colombian male cyclists
Vuelta a Colombia stage winners
People from Barranquilla
Competitors at the 2018 Central American and Caribbean Games
South American Games medalists in cycling
South American Games gold medalists for Colombia
South American Games silver medalists for Colombia
Competitors at the 2022 South American Games